Dead Men Tell No Tales is a 1938 British thriller film directed by David MacDonald and starring Emlyn Williams, Sara Seegar and Hugh Williams. It is based on the 1935 novel The Norwich Victims by Francis Beeding. The film was made at Welwyn Studios.

Plot
An English schoolteacher wins a French lottery, but on her way to Paris she is murdered and an imposter attempts to claim her prize.

Cast
 Emlyn Williams as Dr. Headlam 
 Sara Seegar as Marjorie 
 Hugh Williams as Detective Inspector Martin 
 Marius Goring as Greening 
 Lesley Brook as Elizabeth Orme 
Christine Silver as Miss Haslett
 Clive Morton as Frank Fielding 
 Ann Wilton as Bridget 
 Jack Vyvian as Crump 
 Marjorie Dale as The Singer 
 Hal Gordon as Sergeant

References

Bibliography
 Goble, Alan. The Complete Index to Literary Sources in Film. Walter de Gruyter, 2011. 
 Shafer, Stephen C. British popular films, 1929-1939: the cinema of reassurance. Routledge, 1997.

External links

1938 films
1938 thriller films
Films directed by David MacDonald (director)
British thriller films
Films shot at Welwyn Studios
Films based on British novels
British black-and-white films
1930s English-language films
1930s British films